Maurice Ravel was a Basque French composer and pianist of Impressionist music.

The word ravel has to do with thread and yarn.

Ravel may also refer to:

People with the name
 Ann M. Ravel, American lawyer and member of the Federal Election Commission
 Bruno Ravel (born 1964), American heavy metal guitarist
 Edeet Ravel (born 1955), Israeli-Canadian novelist
 Freddie Ravel, American keyboardist, recording artist and international keynote speaker
 Gaston Ravel (1878–1958), French film director and screenwriter
 Jules-Jean Ravel (1901–1986), French communist politician and trade union organizer
 Pierre Joseph Ravel (1832–1908), Swiss civil engineer, father of the composer
 Ravel Morrison (born 1993), English footballer

Other uses
 Ravel, Puy-de-Dôme, France, a commune
 Château de Ravel, a castle situated in the commune
 4727 Ravel, a main-belt asteroid
 Ravel Peak, Alexander Island, Antarctica
 RAVeL network, an initiative to build a network of pedestrian paths in Wallonia, Belgium

See also 
 
 Raval (disambiguation)
 Ravels, Antwerp
 Tallinn, also known as Reval